Pyrisitia nise, the mimosa yellow, is a butterfly in the family Pieridae. It is found from Argentina north to the Texas Gulf Coast and throughout central and southern Florida, northward to the Tennessee Valley. It is an occasional stray to central Texas and south-eastern Arizona and rarely to southern California, southern Colorado and Kansas. The habitat consists of brushy woodland edges.

Both sexes are yellow. The upperside of the forewing has narrow black outer edges. Black margins of the hindwing are uncommon in males, but always absent in females. Adults are on wing from May to August in southern Florida, September to November in southern Texas and all year round in the tropics. Adults feed on flower nectar.

The larvae feed on Mimosa pudica.

Subspecies

The following subspecies are recognized:
P. n. nise (Jamaica)
P. n. stygma (Boisduval, 1836) (Peru, Ecuador)
P. n. tenella (Boisduval, 1836) (Brazil: Rio de Janeiro, Argentina, Paraguay)
P. n. larae (Herrich-Schäffer, 1862) (Cuba)
P. n. nelphe (R. Felder, 1869) (Mexico, Panama)
P. n. floscula (Weeks, 1901) (Bolivia, Argentina, Peru)

References

nise
Butterflies of North America
Butterflies of Central America
Butterflies of the Caribbean
Pieridae of South America
Butterflies of Cuba
Butterflies of Jamaica
Lepidoptera of Brazil
Lepidoptera of Ecuador
Fauna of the Amazon
Arthropods of Argentina
Invertebrates of Bolivia
Butterflies described in 1775
Taxa named by Pieter Cramer